Evan Wensley Wenceslaus (born 15 August 1998) is a Malaysian professional footballer who plays as a left-back.

Club career

Kelantan United (loan)
On 28 May 2021, Evan signed to Kelantan United on loan deals.

International career
Evan represented Malaysia U22 at 2019 AFF U-22 Youth Championship.

References

External links

1998 births
Living people
Malaysian footballers
People from Sabah
Sabah F.C. (Malaysia) players
Kelantan United F.C. players
Association football defenders